Mandeok Station is a station of Busan Metro Line 3 in Mandeok-dong, Buk District, Busan, South Korea.

External links

  Cyber station information from Busan Transportation Corporation

Busan Metro stations
Buk District, Busan
Railway stations opened in 2005